St Columba's Church (also known as Strone Church) is a Church of Scotland church building in Strone, Argyll and Bute, Scotland. The church is located on Shore Road at the mouth of the Holy Loch on its northern banks and near its merging with Loch Long. It is a Category C listed building.

Its architect was Peter MacGregor Chalmers, who was commissioned to build a new church in 1908. He retained the original church tower, adding a Romanesque entrance at its base. It is believed the material from the old church was re-used on the exterior, and Corrie sandstone used in the interior. Its spire is made of ashlar.

See also

List of listed buildings in Dunoon

References

External links
Strone, St Columba's Church - Canmore.org.uk

Category C listed buildings in Argyll and Bute
Listed churches in Scotland
Churches in Argyll and Bute
1859 establishments in Scotland